Paraceratitella is a genus of tephritid  or fruit flies in the family Tephritidae.

Species
The genus contains the following species.

 Paraceratitella compta
 Paraceratitella connexa
 Paraceratitella eurycephala
 Paraceratitella oblonga

References

External links

Dacinae
Tephritidae genera